1984: Spring / A Choice of Futures is a book by Arthur C. Clarke published in 1984.

Plot summary
1984: Spring / A Choice of Futures is a book consisting of 31 non-fiction pieces.

Reception
Dave Langford reviewed 1984: Spring / A Choice of Futures for White Dwarf #68, and stated that "Plenty of good things here: too many, really, as Clarke reprints several speeches which make points in the same words. Where was his editor?"

Reviews
Review by Dan Chow (1984) in Locus, #277 February 1984
Review by Robert Coulson (1984) in Amazing Stories, July 1984
Review by Richard D. Erlich (1984) in Fantasy Review, July 1984
Review by Tom Easton (1984) in Analog Science Fiction/Science Fact, September 1984

References

1984 books
Books by Arthur C. Clarke
Del Rey books